William Green (1894 – June 4, 1925) was a Negro leagues third baseman for several years before the founding of the first Negro National League, and in its first few seasons.

He played most of his career for the Chicago Giants.

References

External links
 and Baseball-Reference Black Baseball stats and Seamheads

Chicago American Giants players
Detroit Stars players
1894 births
1925 deaths
Baseball players from Chicago
Baseball third basemen
Chicago Giants players
Pittsburgh Keystones players
Kansas City Monarchs players
20th-century African-American sportspeople
Kansas City Royal Giants players